Karen Renee Toles is an American Democratic politician from Maryland. Following the resignation of State Delegate Dereck E. Davis to serve as the Treasurer of Maryland, Governor Larry Hogan appointed her to serve the remainder of his term. Since 2022, she has served in the Maryland House of Delegates, representing district 25, based in Prince George's County.

Early life
Toles was born in Prince George's County, Maryland and attended Forestville High School in Forestville, Maryland. She graduated from the University of Maryland, College Park in 2000, earning a B.S. degree in public health. She has also earned a J.D. degree from the University of Baltimore Law School.

Career
Toles has worked as a political and legislative consultant on various organizations, including the American Federation of State, County and Municipal Employees (AFSCME) and United Mine Workers of America (UMWA) labor unions, and for Prince George's County State's Attorney Aisha N. Braveboy. She has also operated her own policy consulting business, Paramount Policy Partners, since 2019.

Toles entered politics in 2008, working as a regional field coordinator for the Democratic National Committee until 2010. She was elected to represent District 7 of the Prince George's County Council in 2010, a position she held until 2018.

In 2012, Toles was charged with reckless driving after traveling in a county-owned vehicle at a speed of 105 miles per hour on the Capital Beltway. Toles apologized for the incident, saying that she would voluntarily enroll in a driver improvement class and discontinue her use of county-owned vehicles. Anne Arundel District Court Judge Megan Johnson gave Toles probation before judgment in relation to the charge.

In January 2022, the Prince George's Democratic Central Committee unanimously voted to elect Toles to serve in the Maryland House of Delegates, filling a vacancy left by the resignation of former delegate Dereck E. Davis. Governor Larry Hogan officially appointed her to the House of Delegates on January 11, 2022, and she was sworn in the next day.

In the legislature
Toles was sworn into the Maryland House of Delegates on January 12, 2022. She was elected to a full term in the 2022 general election.

Other memberships
 Legislative Black Caucus of Maryland, 2022–present
 Women Legislators of Maryland, 2022–present

Electoral history

References and notes

Living people
1976 births
Democratic Party members of the Maryland House of Delegates
21st-century American politicians
21st-century American women politicians
University of Maryland, College Park alumni
University of Baltimore School of Law alumni
County commissioners in Maryland